Colin Kirkham (born 30 October 1944) is a male retired British long-distance runner. Kirkham competed in the marathon at the 1972 Summer Olympics. He represented England in the marathon event, at the 1974 British Commonwealth Games in Christchurch, New Zealand.

Kirkham studied at Durham University, where he was a member of St Cuthbert's Society and won the Northern Counties Marathon Championship.

References

1944 births
Living people
Alumni of St Cuthbert's Society, Durham
Athletes (track and field) at the 1972 Summer Olympics
Athletes (track and field) at the 1974 British Commonwealth Games
British male long-distance runners
British male marathon runners
Olympic athletes of Great Britain
Sportspeople from Nottingham
Commonwealth Games competitors for England